Katkovo is a rural locality (a selo) in Bobkovsky Selsoviet, Rubtsovsky District, Altai Krai, Russia. The population was 371 as of 2013. There are 6 streets.

Geography 
Katkovo is located 33 km northeast of Rubtsovsk (the district's administrative centre) by road. Posyolok imeni Kalinina is the nearest rural locality.

References 

Rural localities in Rubtsovsky District